Jeffrey Steven Franklin (born January 21, 1955) is an American screenwriter, director and producer. He is best known for being the creator of the ABC sitcom Full House and its Netflix sequel Fuller House.

Early life 
Franklin was born in Inglewood, California, and raised in a Jewish family.. In 1976 Franklin graduated from the University of the Pacific. He studied media production at UCLA while working as a substitute teacher in his hometown, before becoming a writer.

Career 
Franklin began his television career as a writer and producer for Laverne & Shirley and Bosom Buddies. Franklin pitched his own show to ABC called "House of Comics" which featured three comics living together. ABC was looking for a family sitcom, so Franklin added children and the idea evolved into the show Full House, which ran on the ABC network from 1987 to 1995.

During Full House, Franklin created Hangin' with Mr. Cooper, starring comedian Mark Curry. Franklin departed for Hanging with Mr. Cooper in September 1992. His other TV credits include both writing and production on shows such as, It's Garry Shandling's Show, and Malcolm & Eddie. He also wrote, produced and directed the first Olsen twins movie, To Grandmother's House We Go. By 1991, Jeff Franklin had received a deal with Lorimar, but the pact was terminated in 1993 so that he could become an independent producer. In 1997, he had signed a deal with Columbia TriStar Television.

Franklin's most notable film writing credits include the teen comedies Just One of the Guys (1985) and Summer School (1987), starring Mark Harmon.

On April 20, 2015, Netflix announced the streaming service would pick up thirteen episodes of Fuller House, a sequel to Full House. Netflix also announced Franklin would oversee the production along with Robert L. Boyett and Thomas L. Miller. All 13 episodes of the first season premiered on February 26, 2016. The series ended in its fifth season on June 2, 2020, due to competition and inability to grow significantly its audience.

 Criticism 
In February 2018, Franklin parted ways from the series Fuller House.

In June 2019, The Hollywood Reporter revealed details of a probe made by Warner Brothers that included interviews with eight Fuller House staffers who commented on Franklin's alleged conduct. 

Jeff Franklin sued the showrunner, blaming the co-executive producer Bryan Behar for orchestrating a conspiracy aiming to get him kicked out of the show, to discredit Franklin and replace him. Franklin denied all the allegations of misconduct.

 Personal life 
In 1994, Franklin bought 10050 Cielo Drive, the site of the Tate murders in 1969. The French country-style home was eventually demolished and replaced by a mansion designed by architect Richard Landry. In 2014, he listed for sale another house designed by Landry in the Hollywood Hills for US$30 million.

 Filmography 

 Film 
1985: Just One of the Guys (co-writer with Dennis Feldman)
1987: Summer School (screenwriter)
1999: Love Stinks (writer, director)

 Television 
1979: The Bad News Bears (screenwriter)
1979–81: Laverne & Shirley (screenwriter)
1982: Bosom Buddies (producer)
1984: Young Hearts (movie; screenwriter)
1987: It's Garry Shandling's Show (producer)
1989: Wally and the Valentines (movie; writer, executive producer)
1987–92: Full House (creator; executive producer seasons 1-5)
1997: Head Over Heels (creator; executive producer)
1992-93: Stunt Dawgs (Creator)
1992–97: Hangin' with Mr. Cooper (creator; executive producer)
1996–99: Malcolm & Eddie (TV) (executive producer)
2010: Love That Girl! (executive producer)
2011: The Last Resort (movie; executive producer, writer, director)
2016–2020: Fuller House'' (creator; executive producer seasons 1-4)

References

External links 

1955 births
Film producers from California
American male screenwriters
American television directors
Television producers from California
American television writers
Living people
People from Beverly Hills, California
Showrunners
American male television writers
Film directors from California
Screenwriters from California
21st-century American screenwriters
21st-century American male writers